Ivette María Tato (born 27 July 1975) is a former backstroke swimmer from Spain who competed at the 1996 Summer Olympics in Atlanta, Georgia for her native country. In the Georgia Tech Aquatic Center she finished in 23rd place in the 200 m Backstroke. Four years later, when Sydney, Australia hosted the Summer Games, she ended up in 16th place in the same event, and was a member of the Women's Relay Team in the 4 × 100 m Medley (15th position). She was born  in Barcelona, Catalonia.

References

Spanish Olympic Committee

1975 births
Living people
Spanish female backstroke swimmers
Olympic swimmers of Spain
Swimmers at the 1996 Summer Olympics
Swimmers at the 2000 Summer Olympics
Swimmers from Barcelona
European Aquatics Championships medalists in swimming